Tongatapu 8 is an electoral constituency for the Legislative Assembly in the Kingdom of Tonga. It was established for the November 2010 general election, when the multi-seat regional constituencies for People's Representatives were replaced by single-seat constituencies, electing one representative via the first past the post electoral system. Located on the country's main island, Tongatapu, it encompasses the villages of Malapo, Vaini, Longoteme, Folaha, Nukuhetulu, Kauvai, and Veitongo.

Its first ever representative was Sione Taione, a first time MP, representing the Democratic Party of the Friendly Islands. At the 2014 election he was replaced by Semisi Fakahau, who held it until his death in 2022. The subsequent by-election was won by Johnny Taione.

Members of Parliament

Election results

2010

2014
Along with five other incumbent DPFI MPs, Sione Taione was not selected as a DPFI candidate for this election, and announced he would be running as an independent candidate.

References

Tongan legislative constituencies
Tongatapu
2010 establishments in Tonga
Constituencies established in 2010